The International Seabed Authority (ISA) is a Kingston, Jamaica-based intergovernmental body of 167 member states and the European Union established under the 1982 UN Convention on the Law of the Sea (UNCLOS) and its 1994 Agreement on Implementation. The ISA's dual mission is to authorize and control development of mineral related operations in the international seabed considered the "common heritage of all mankind" and also protect the ecosystem of the seabed, ocean floor and subsoil in "The Area" beyond national jurisdiction. The ISA is to safeguard the international deep sea, the waters below 200 meters or 656 feet, where photosynthesis is hampered by inadequate light. Governing approximately half of the total area of the world's oceans, the ISA is to exercise oversight of activities that might threaten biological diversity and harm the marine environment. The Authority operates as an autonomous international organization with its own Assembly, Council and Secretariat.

Since the ISA's inception in 1994, the Authority has approved over two dozen ocean floor mining exploration contracts in the Atlantic, Pacific and Indian Oceans, with the majority of contracts for exploration in the Clarion-Clipperton Zone between Hawaii and Mexico, where polymetallic nodules contain copper, cobalt and other minerals used to power electric batteries. To date, the Authority has not authorized any commercial mining contracts as it deliberates over regulations amid global calls for a moratorium on deep sea mining. Scientists and environmentalists warn such mining could wreak havoc on the ocean as a carbon sink home to rare and diverse species. The ISA is funded by UNCLOS members and mining contractors and led by Secretary-General Michael Lodge, a British barrister who oversees a 47-member administrative body and has come under criticism for close ties to the mining industry and support for deep sea robotic exploration to develop renewable energy.

Origin
The Authority held its first inaugural meeting in its host country, Jamaica, on 16 November 1994, the day the Convention came into force.  The articles governing the Authority have been made "noting the political and economic changes, including market-oriented approaches, affecting the implementation" of the convention. The Authority obtained its observer status to the United Nations in October 1996. Currently, the Authority has 167 members and the European Union, composed of all parties to the United Nations Convention on the Law of the Sea. The Authority operates by contracting with private and public corporations and other entities authorizing them to explore, and potentially exploit, specified areas on the deep seabed for mineral resources, such as cobalt, nickel and manganese.

"Common Heritage of All Mankind" 
Under UNCLOS, Part XI, Section 2. "The Area and its resources are the common heritage of mankind." As a result, ISA must ensure that activities in the Area are undertaken only for peaceful purposes and for the benefit of all humankind, with economic benefits shared equitably and special consideration given to the needs of developing nations.

Governance and operations 
Along with a Secretary-General, two principal organs establish the policies and govern the work of the Authority: the Assembly, in which all UNCLOS parties are represented, and a 36-member Council elected by the Assembly.

Secretary-General 
The Assembly elects a Secretary-General to serve a four-year term as the ISA's chief administrative officer, oversee Authority staff and issue an annual report to the Assembly. The Secretary-General is prohibited from holding a financial interest in any mining operations authorized by the Authority.

In July 2016, the Assembly of the Authority elected Michael Lodge of the United Kingdom, for a four-year term as Secretary-General beginning 1 January 2017. He succeeds Nii Allotey Odunton of Ghana, who had served two consecutive four-year terms since 2008.

Assembly 
The Assembly, which consists of all members of the Authority, elects the 36-member Council, as well as the Secretary-General from among candidates the Council recommends. The Assembly also has the power to approve or reject the council's recommendations for the following: rules and regulations governing seabed mining, distribution of financial benefits accrued from authorized mining and the Authority's annual budget.

Council 
The 36-member Council, elected by the Assembly, authorizes contracts with governments and private corporations to explore and mine the international seabed and sets rules and procedures, subject to the Assembly's approval, for ISA governance. The council also nominates a Secretary-General, who then must be elected by the full Assembly to serve a four-year term. The ISA's annual plenary sessions, which usually last two weeks, are held in Kingston.

Advisory bodies 
Also established is a 30-member Legal and Technical Commission which advises the Council and a 15-member Finance Committee that deals with budgetary and related matters.  All members are experts nominated by governments and elected to serve in their individual capacity.

Enterprise 
The convention also established a body called the Enterprise which is to serve as the Authority's own mining operator, potentially generating "hundreds of millions of dollars in royalties" to be shared with developing nations." The environmental organization Greenpeace has expressed concerns over the ISA's alleged conflict of interest as both regulator and business operator, though the ISA refutes the conflict of interest charge.

Status
The Authority currently has a Secretariat of 37 authorized posts and a 2022 biennial budget of approximately $10,000,000.

Jurisdiction 
ISA has no role in determining this boundary. Rather, this task is left to another body established by UNCLOS, the Commission on the Limits of the Continental Shelf, which examines scientific data submitted by coastal states that claim a broader reach.

Exploration contracts and commercial mining

Commercial 
Although the ISA has yet to approve commercial mining contracts, the Authority anticipates commercial mining could begin as early as 2023–2024 with the completion of much-debated ISA regulations. In 2021, the Pacific Island nation of Nauru triggered a deadline that requires the ISA to approve final commercial mining regulations by July 2023 or allow contractors to mine under existing draft regulations.

Exploratory 
Exploratory mining involves "deep-sea mapping, manned submersibles or remotely-operated vehicles, photographic and video systems, and drilling devices."

Clarion-Clipperton Zone 

Most current areas of exploration are in the Clarion-Clipperton Zone (CCZ), in the Equatorial North Pacific Ocean, south and southeast of Hawaii, between Hawaii and Mexico. The quiet CCZ, as wide as the continental U.S., is home to polymetallic nodules or trillions of potato-size lumps of matter formed over millions of years that contain nickel, manganese, copper, zinc and cobalt, as well as deep water coral, sponges and unusual species ("ghost octopus", crustaceans, worms and sea cucumbers) that in a near light-less environment attach to the rock-like nodules for shelter. Contractors want to mine polymetallic nodules for battery storage for electric vehicles, Smartphones and solar and wind energy.

Other areas of exploration 
Exploration contracts for polymetallic nodules have also been issued for contractors operating in the Central Indian Ocean Basin and Western Pacific Ocean. The ISA has issued exploration contracts for polymetallic sulphides in the South West Indian Ridge, Central Indian Ridge and the Mid-Atlantic Ridge, and contracts for exploration for cobalt-rich crusts in the Western Pacific Ocean.

Requirements of contractors 
Each contractor is required to develop a contingency plan should something go wrong during exploration, report once a year on its activities in its assigned area and propose a training program for developing countries .

List of exploratory contractors 
The ISA has signed 15-year contracts for exploration with 22 contractors seeking polymetallic nodules, polymetallic sulphides and cobalt-rich ferromanganese crusts in the deep seabed.

In 2001-2002 the ISA signed contracts with Yuzhmorgeologya (Russian Federation); Interoceanmetal Joint Organization (IOM) (Bulgaria, Cuba, Slovakia, Czech Republic, Poland and Russian Federation); the Government of the Republic of Korea; China Ocean Minerals Research and Development Association (COMRA) (China); Deep Ocean Resources Development Company (DORD) (Japan); Institut français de recherche pour l’exploitation de la mer (IFREMER) (France); the Government of India. In 2006, the Authority signed a 15-year contract with the Federal Institute for Geosciences and Natural Resources of Germany.

In 2008, the Authority received two new applications for authorization to explore for polymetallic nodules, coming for the first time from private firms in developing island nations of the Pacific. Sponsored by their respective governments, they were submitted by Nauru Ocean Resources Inc. and Tonga Offshore Mining Limited. A 15-year exploration contract was granted by the Authority to Nauru Ocean Resources Inc. on 22 July 2011 and to Tonga Offshore Mining Limited on 12 January 2012.

Fifteen-year exploration contracts for polymetallic nodules were also granted to G-TECH Sea Mineral Resources NV (Belgium) on 14 January 2013; Marawa Research and Exploration Ltd (Kiribati) on 19 January 2015; Ocean Mineral Singapore Pte Ltd on 22 January 2015; UK Seabed Resources Ltd (two contracts on 8 February 2013 and 29 March 2016 respectively); Cook Islands Investment Corporation on 15 July 2016 and more recently China Minmetals Corporation on 12 May 2017.

The Authority has signed seven contracts for the exploration for polymetallic sulphides in the South West Indian Ridge, Central Indian Ridge and Mid-Atlantic Ridge with China Ocean Mineral Resources Research and Development Association (18 November 2011); the Government of Russia (29 October 2012); Government of the Republic of Korea (24 June 2014); Institut français de recherche pour l’exploitation de la mer (Ifremer, France, 18 November 2014); the Federal Institute for Geosciences and Natural Resources of Germany (6 May 2015); and the Government of India (26 September 2016) and the Government of the Republic of Poland (12 February 2018).

The Authority also holds five contracts for the exploration of cobalt-rich ferromanganese crusts in the Western Pacific Ocean with China Ocean Mineral Resources Research and Development Association (29 April 2014); Japan Oil Gas and Metals National Corporation (JOGMEC, 27 January 2014); Ministry of Natural Resources and Environment of the Russian Federation (10 March 2015), Companhia De Pesquisa de Recursos Minerais (9 November 2015) and the Government of the Republic of Korea (27 March 2018).

Controversy

Environmental concerns and climate crisis 
Environmentalists, scientists from 44 countries, Google, BMW and Volvo, World Wildlife Fund and several Pacific nations, including Fiji and Papua New Guinea, have called for a moratorium on deep-sea mining until more scientific research is conducted on its impact on the marine environment.

Advocates for deep sea mining argue extraction of rare metals is critical for electric car batteries necessary to develop a fossil-free economy.

Opponents argue seabed mining could wreak havoc on the world's oceans, which act as a carbon sink absorbing a quarter of the world's carbon emissions each year.

The environmental organization Greenpeace has raised objections about deep seabed mining disrupting the habitats of newly reported species, from crabs to whales to snails that survive without eating and congregate near bioluminescent thermal vents. Greenpeace has urged the ISA to further develop UNCLOS' foundational Article 136 principle "of common heritage to all mankind" to revise regulations and set conservation targets. In a 2018 Greenpeace Research Laboratories report the organization stressed the importance of protecting marine biodiversity from toxins released during seabed mining for natural gas and rare metals for photovoltaic cells. Greenpeace maintains the "pro-exploitation" ISA is not the appropriate authority to regulate deep sea mining (DSM). In 2019 Greenpeace activists protested outside the annual meeting of the International Seabed Authority in Jamaica, calling for a global ocean treaty to ban deep sea mining in ocean sanctuaries. Some of the activists had sailed to Jamaica aboard Greenpeace's ship, the Esperanza, which travelled from the "Lost City in the mid-Atlantic", an area Greenpeace says is threatened by exploratory mining the ISA authorized.

ISA Secretary-General Michael Lodge said Greenpeace's support for a global ocean treaty, not the ISA, to control deep sea mining did not make sense.

Concern over transparency issues 
In 2022, The Guardian reported the ISA failed to renew the contract for Earth Negotiations Bulletin (ENB), a division of the International Institute for Sustainable Development (IISD), which covered past proceedings to maintain an independent record of the ISA. The decision came amid warnings from scientists that commercial ocean floor mining "would be “dangerous”, “reckless” and “irreversible” in its harm to the ecosystem. In its defense, the ISA said ENB's non-renewal was triggered by budget cuts. The Guardian also reported that Germany and environmentalists had raised questions about the lack of transparency by the ISA's Legal and Technical Commission (LTC), which conducts closed meetings to set standards and issue guidelines for seabed mining.

In response to criticism, ISA Secretary-General Michael Lodge defended ISA as a "transparent public forum of consensus-building."

Charges of conflict of interest 
In 2022, the Los Angeles Times reported that the International Seabed Authority faced criticisms over conflicts of interest. The LA Times reported that the ISA was scheduled to approve seabed mining, despite concerns by scientists and environmentalists about the environmental impact. ISA head Michael Lodge had criticized these groups, saying there was "a growing environmental absolutism and dogmatism bordering on fanaticism" and arguing that seabed mining was "predictable and manageable". Scientists and members of Lodge's staff objected to Lodge's appearance in a mining company video seeking investments in robotic exploration for minerals to manufacture electric vehicles. In the video, Lodge said his agency supported a 15-year exploration contract because "land-based resources are becoming increasingly difficult to access."

United States' non-ratification of UNCLOS 
The exact nature of the ISA's mission and authority has been questioned by opponents of the Law of the Sea Treaty who are generally skeptical of multilateral engagement by the United States. In 2007, although the US Senate Foreign Relations Committee voted in favor of treaty ratification, the full Senate failed to ratify the treaty, with some Republicans arguing UNCLOS might threaten national security by interfering with ocean military operations and hinder seabed mining corporations by imposing environmental regulations.

One of the main anti-ratification arguments being a charge that the ISA is flawed or unnecessary. In its original form, the Convention included certain provisions that some found objectionable, such as:
 Use of collected money for wealth redistribution in addition to ISA administration
 Mandatory technology transfer

Because of these concerns, the United States pushed for modification of the Convention, obtaining a 1994 Agreement on Implementation that somewhat mitigates them and thus modifies the ISA's authority. Despite this change the United States has not ratified the Convention and so is not a member of ISA, although it sends sizable delegations to participate in meetings as an observer.

As an observer, not an UNCLOS signatory, the U.S. will not be allowed to vote on approval of final commercial mining regulations and will be unable to sponsor companies to apply for contracts in international waters. This is because the ISA requires contractors be sponsored by a state that is a signatory to UNCLOS. U.S.-based military contractor Lockheed Martin, however, is participating in two British deep sea mining projects.

Activities

Legislative 
The Authority's main legislative accomplishment to date has been the adoption, in the year 2000, of regulations governing exploration for polymetallic nodules. These resources, also called manganese nodules, contain varying amounts of manganese, cobalt, copper and nickel.  They occur as potato-sized lumps scattered about on the surface of the ocean floor, mainly in the central Pacific Ocean in the Clarion-Clipperton Zone but with some deposits in the Indian Ocean.

In 2013, the ISA approved amendments to its Mining Code on deep sea exploration, stating a prospector should take a precautionary approach to avoid polluting the ocean and should immediately inform the Secretary-General of any prospect-related incidents that threaten the marine environment.  The amended regulations also said a contractor can recover "a reasonable amount of material" for testing but not for sale.

In July, 2019, the ISA's Legal and Trade Commission prepared "Draft regulations on exploitation of mineral resources in the Area."

In 2010, the ISA adopted Regulations on Prospecting and Exploration for Polymetallic Sulphides.

In 2012, the Authority adopted Regulations on Prospecting and Exploration for Cobalt-Rich Ferromanganese Crusts.

The Council of the Authority began work, in August 2002, on another set of regulations, covering polymetallic sulfides and cobalt-rich ferromanganese crusts, which are rich sources of such minerals as copper, iron, zinc, silver and gold, as well as cobalt. The sulphides are found around volcanic hot springs, especially in the western Pacific Ocean, while the crusts occur on oceanic ridges and elsewhere at several locations around the world.  The Council decided in 2006 to prepare separate sets of regulations for sulphides and for crusts, with priority given to sulphides. It devoted most of its sessions in 2007 and 2008 to this task, but several issues remained unresolved. Chief among these were the definition and configuration of the area to be allocated to contractors for exploration, the fees to be paid to the Authority and the question of how to deal with any overlapping claims that might arise. Meanwhile, the Legal and Technical Commission reported progress on ferromanganese crusts.

Workshops and research 
In addition to its legislative work, the Authority organizes annual workshops on various aspects of seabed exploration, with emphasis on measures to protect the marine environment from any harmful consequences.  It disseminates the results of these meetings through publications. Studies over several years covering the key mineral area of the Central Pacific resulted in a technical study on biodiversity, species ranges and gene flow in the abyssal Pacific nodule province, with emphasis on predicting and managing the impacts of deep seabed mining A workshop at Manoa, Hawaii, in October 2007 produced a rationale and recommendations for the establishment of "preservation reference areas" in the Clarion-Clipperton Zone, where nodule mining would be prohibited in order to leave the natural environment intact. In recent years, the ISA hosted workshops on enhancing the role of women in conducting deep-sea scientific studies, sustainable management of deep seabed resources, a series for Africa on resources and technologies for DSM and a session on sharing the economic benefits of DSM.

National trends in seabed mining 
In recent years, however, interest in deep sea mining, especially with regard to ferromanganese crusts and polymetallic sulphides, has picked up among several firms now operating in waters within the national zones of Papua New Guinea, Fiji and Tonga. Papua New Guinea was the first country in the world to grant commercial exploration licenses for seafloor massive sulphide deposits when it granted the initial license to Nautilus Minerals in 1997. Japan's new ocean policy emphasizes the need to develop methane hydrate and hydrothermal deposits within Japan's exclusive economic zone and calls for the commercialization of these resources within the next 10 years. Reporting on these developments in his annual report to the Authority in April 2008, Secretary-General Nandan referred also to the upward trend in demand and prices for cobalt, copper, nickel and manganese, the main metals that would be derived from seabed mining, and he noted that technologies being developed for offshore extraction could be adapted for deep sea mining.

Recently, there has been much interest in the possibility of exploiting seabed resources in the Arctic Ocean, bordered by Canada, Denmark, Iceland, Norway, Russia and the United States (see Territorial claims in the Arctic). In 2020, an international coalition of environmental groups urged the government of Norway to not only abandon plans for deep sea mining under national jurisdiction, but to also speak out against DSM Arctic mining before the International Seaboard Authority.

Endowment fund
In 2006 the Authority established an Endowment Fund to Support Collaborative Marine Scientific Research on the International Seabed Area. The Fund will aid experienced scientists and technicians from developing countries to participate in deep-sea research organized by international and national institutions. A campaign was launched in February 2008 to identify participants, establish a network of cooperating bodies and seek outside funds to augment the initial $3 million endowment from the Authority.

Voluntary commitments
In 2017, the Authority registered seven voluntary commitments with the UN Oceans Conference for Sustainable Development Goal 14. These were:
OceanAction15467 – Enhancing the role of women in marine scientific research through capacity building
OceanAction15796 – Encouraging dissemination of research results through the ISA Secretary-General Award for Excellence in Deep-Sea Research
OceanAction16538 – Abyssal Initiative for Blue Growth (with UN-DESA)
OceanAction16494 – Fostering cooperation to promote the sustainable development of Africa's deep seabed resources in support of Africas Blue Economy
OceanAction17746 – Enhancing the assessment of essential ecological functions of the deep sea oceans through long-term underwater oceanographic observatories in the Area; 
OceanAction17776 – Enhancing deep sea marine biodiversity assessment through the creation of online taxonomic atlases linked to deep sea mining activities in the Area

See also
 UNCLOS (United Nations Convention on the Law of the Sea)
 Commission on the Limits of the Continental Shelf
 Deep Sea Mining
 Clarion-Clipperton Zone
 Polymetallic nodules
 International waters
 Seabed Arms Control Treaty
 United Nations Trusteeship Council
 Antarctic Treaty Secretariat

References

External links
 International Seabed Authority
 Overview – Convention & Related Agreements. UN: United Nations Convention on the Law of the Sea (1982).
 Developing a Regulatory Framework for Mineral Exploitation in the Area (Submission to the International Seabed Authority on the report to ISA members and stakeholders)
 DEEP TROUBLE: The murky world of the deep sea mining industry (Greenpeace International, 2020)
 The Mining Code: Exploration Regulations (ISA, 2013)

 
Law of the sea
Mining law and governance
United Nations General Assembly observers
Organizations established in 1994
Intergovernmental organizations established by treaty
International organisations based in Jamaica